The Heartland Expressway (also known as the National Highway System High Priority Corridor 14) is a federally designated High Priority Corridor between Limon, Colorado, and Rapid City, South Dakota in the US. The proposed four-lane corridor is currently under construction, and when completed, will function as the central third of the Ports-to-Plains Alliance, connecting the Ports to Plains Corridor and Theodore Roosevelt Expressway via the Nebraska Panhandle. When completed, the highway will provide multi-lane, divided highway access to cities including Alliance, Nebraska; Scottsbluff, Nebraska; and Brush, Colorado, bringing long-term economic development and reducing travel times in the region.

The proposed $500 million highway is part of a larger project that would create an international trade corridor from Canada to Mexico for the region’s abundant energy and agricultural products, with local community leaders long promoting its completion. Up to $943 million in economic benefits is estimated for the region over a 38-year span as a result of the project, through increased traffic volume, travel time savings, improved connections among trade centers, better labor access, improved access to manufacturing centers, better connections between agricultural centers and markets, better access between raw materials and processors, better access for tourists to local fossil sites, and bring an estimated average of 2.5 million annual savings from accident reduction, 385-950 additional annual jobs and 9.5 million to 24.8 million in annual earnings.

History 
The project started in 1988, as part of the Nebraska Expressway System program. The Intermodal Surface Transportation Efficiency Act of 1991 made it the National Highway System High Priority Corridor 14. However, parts of the program, including the Heartland Expressway were delayed. The long-delayed highway was estimated in 2012 to cost more than $500 million and take 20 years to complete, according to preliminary estimates for the project, with an estimated time of finalizing the highway in the fall of 2018. The highway has been under construction.

Future 
The alignment of the Heartland Expressway will largely follow existing highways, with the project mostly consisting of improvements.

 Widen U.S. Route 26 (US 26) to a four-lane divided highway from Torrington, Wyoming, to County Road 10 (CR 10) east of Morrill, Nebraska.
 Widen US 26 to a four-lane divided highway from CR 30 in Minatare, Nebraska, to the US  26/L62A junction.
 Widen L62A to four lanes with median from US 26/L62A split to US 385.
 Widen US 385 to four lanes with median from L62A to Nebraska Highway 2 (NE 2) in Alliance, Nebraska
 Improve US 385 into a super-2 facility to include  lanes,  shoulders, auxiliary turn lanes and passing lanes from NE 2 to US 20 in Chadron, Nebraska. This should be constructed in accordance to the super-2 criteria. The ultimate roadway section would include a four-lane highway when traffic volumes warrant the four-lane section.
 Improve the intersection of US 385 and US 20.
 Improve US 385 into a super-2 facility to include  lanes,  shoulders, auxiliary turn lanes and passing lanes from US 20 west of Chadron, Nebraska to Oelrichs, South Dakota.
 Additional major safety and bottleneck improvements.

References 

Proposed roads in the United States